Lubell is a surname. Notable people with the surname include:

 David Lubell, American mathematician known for the Lubell–Yamamoto–Meshalkin inequality
 Nathaniel Lubell (1916–2006), American fencer
Samuel Lubell (1911–1987), American pollster, journalist, and author
 Winifred Milius Lubell (1914–2012), American illustrator, artist, and writer